Santee is a suburban city in San Diego County, California, with a population of 60,075 at the 2020 census. Although it is a part of the East County region, Santee is located just  from the Pacific Ocean. The city is connected to the coastline by State Route 52, a six-lane freeway that runs from Interstate 5 in La Jolla to State Route 67 in El Cajon.

History

The region was the homeland of the Kumeyaay people. These original residents established the village of Sinyeweche on the banks of the San Diego River in the present day Santee area.

The city is named after Milton Santee, the second husband of Jennie Blodgett, whose first husband was George A. Cowles, a pioneer rancher and businessperson in the San Diego County area.

Geography
Santee shares the northern part of a valley with the city of El Cajon. The city is bisected by the San Diego River, which flows east to west for approximately  within the city limits. Hills form a natural barrier on its northern and western sides.

At an altitude of 1,198 feet, Rattlesnake Mountain is the highest point in Santee. Rattlesnake Mountain is home to the Sky Ranch community, and is topped with a large illuminated star during the holiday season.

Climate
According to the Köppen Climate Classification system, Santee has a semi-arid climate, abbreviated "BSk" on climate maps.

Demographics

2020 
As of the 2020 census, Santee had a population of 60,075. The population density was 3630.5 inhabitants per square mile (1401.7/km2). The racial makeup of Santee was 41,274 (68.7%) White, 1391 (2.3%) African American, 452 (0.8%) Native American, 3,568 (5.9%) Asian (1.7% Filipino, 1.1% Chinese, 0.5% Vietnamese, 0.3% Japanese, 0.1% Korean, 0.3% Indian, 0.6% Other), 327 (0.5%) Pacific Islander, 4,415 (7.4%) from other races, and 8,609 (14.3%) from two or more races. Hispanic or Latino of any race were 11,313 persons (19.7%).

The census reported that there were 20,509 households, of which 6,241 (30.4%) had children under the age of 18 living in them, 10,273 (50.1%)were opposite-sex married couples living together, 2495 (12.2%) had a female householder with no husband present, 1451 (7.1%) had a male householder with no wife present. There were 1,131 (5.5%) unmarried opposite-sex partnerships, and 147 (0.7%) same-sex married couples or partnerships. 3948.4 (20.3%) households were one person and 2120.05 (10.9%) had a someone living alone who was 65 or older. The average household size was 2.85. There were 14,136 families (72.7% of households). The average family size was 3.3. 

The age distribution was 12,933 (22.5%) under the age of 18, 4,366 people (7.6%) aged 18 to 24, 23,059 (40.2%) aged 15 to 44, and 8,779 (15.3%) aged 65 and older. The median age was 38.9 years. For every 100 females, there were 91.9 males. 

There were 21,848 housing units and 15,599.5 (71.4%) were owner occupied while 5569 (28.6%) were rented. The homeowner vacancy rate was 0.5%; the rental vacancy rate was 1.3%.

2010
At the 2010 census Santee had a population of 53,413. The racial makeup of Santee was 44,083 (82.5%) White, 1,262 (2.0%) African American, 409 (2.1%) Native American, 2,044 (3.8%) Asian (1.8% Filipino, 0.4% Chinese, 0.5% Vietnamese, 0.3% Japanese, 0.2% Korean, 0.2% Indian, 0.5% Other), 253 (0.5%) Pacific Islander, 2,677 (5.0%) from other races, and 2,890 (5.4%) from two or more races. Hispanic or Latino of any race were 8,699 persons (16.3%).

The census reported that 52,447 people (98.2% of the population) lived in households, 77 (0.1%) lived in non-institutionalized group quarters, and 889 (1.7%) were institutionalized.

There were 19,306 households, of which 7,156 (37.1%) had children under the age of 18 living in them, 10,304 (53.4%) were opposite-sex married couples living together, 2,614 (13.5%) had a female householder with no husband present, 1,157 (6.0%) had a male householder with no wife present. There were 1,135 (5.9%) unmarried opposite-sex partnerships, and 119 (0.6%) same-sex married couples or partnerships. 3,986 households (20.6%) were one person and 1,534 (7.9%) had someone living alone who was 65 or older. The average household size was 2.72. There were 14,075 families (72.9% of households); the average family size was 3.13.

The age distribution was 12,710 people (23.8%) under the age of 18, 5,068 people (9.5%) aged 18 to 24, 14,790 people (27.7%) aged 25 to 44, 15,105 people (28.3%) aged 45 to 64, and 5,740 people (10.7%) who were 65 or older. The median age was 37.2 years. For every 100 females, there were 93.6 males. For every 100 females age 18 and over, there were 90.2 males.

There were 20,048 housing units at an average density of 1,212.9 per square mile, of the occupied units 13,576 (70.3%) were owner-occupied and 5,730 (29.7%) were rented. The homeowner vacancy rate was 1.5%; the rental vacancy rate was 4.0%. 36,198 people (67.8% of the population) lived in owner-occupied housing units and 16,249 people (30.4%) lived in rental housing units.

2000
As of the census of 2000, there were 52,975 people in 18,470 households, including 14,018 families, in the city. The population density was 3,298.7 inhabitants per square mile (1,273.6/km2). The racial makeup of the city was 86.70% White, 1.48% African American, 0.81% Native American, 2.55% Asian, 0.41% Pacific Islander, 4.03% from other races, and 4.03% from two or more races. Hispanic or Latino of any race were 11.36% of the population.

Of the 18,470 households 40.9% had children under the age of 18 living with them, 57.7% were married couples living together, 13.0% had a female householder with no husband present, and 24.1% were non-families. 18.2% of households were one person and 6.9% were one person aged 65 or older. The average household size was 2.81 and the average family size was 3.19.

The age distribution was 28.2% under the age of 18, 8.4% from 18 to 24, 32.9% from 25 to 44, 21.6% from 45 to 64, and 8.9% 65 or older. The median age was 35 years. For every 100 females, there were 93.2 males. For every 100 females age 18 and over, there were 89.1 males.

Estimated median household income in 2008: $71,806 (up from $53,624 in 2000)

Economy
It began as a juvenile facility in 1967 and was converted to an adult women's institution in 1979.

The City of Santee hosts a variety of businesses and business benefits. There are many Business Assistance Programs businesses can take part of as stated on the City of Santee's website.

Businesses interested in enhancing their connection with the local City of Santee government and community are also welcome to take part in the City of Santee's Business Visitation Program.

Arts and culture
A 10-week series of free concerts is organized each summer by the city's Community Services Department. The Santee Twilight Brews and Bites Festival, a fund-raiser for local park and youth recreation programs, is held each fall at Town Center Community Park. Santee is also home to Off Broadway Live, a 100-seat, cabaret-style theatre, featuring the Pickwick Players.

Parks and recreation

Sportsplex USA Santee, a  sports field complex, opened on June 1, 2010. Located within Town Center Community Park, it features three lighted softball fields, four batting cages, two lighted arena soccer fields (a.k.a. GTM Stores Arena), spectator seating, parking and a sports-themed restaurant offering food, beer and wine. Santee has hosted the 2012 and 2016 US Olympic Trials for the 50K racewalk on a course along Mast Blvd. below Santana High School.

In addition to being a popular spot for mountain bikers, the city hosts a popular Southern California rock climbing venue called Santee Boulders. Some common routes include "Moby Dick" and "Pride Rock" (located on the North Eastern section of the trail), as well as "Faith Hill" and "Dogpile" (located Northwest of the trail head). Santee Lakes Regional Park and Campground offers  for fishing, camping, bird watching and picnicking. An unincorporated hiking area just north of Santee is popular for mountain bikers. It has entrances at Prince Valiant Drive and Princess Joann Drive and includes many trails that extend to Poway and Santee Lakes. A small pole was recently installed at Boot Rock, which is a boot-shaped rock on a slope that allows views of the entire city and neighboring communities.

Carlton Oaks Golf Course and resort offers was established in 1958.

The  Town Center Community Park is located along the San Diego River. The center of the park features a  sports field complex, and an aquatics center. The park's first two phases were completed in the fall of 2010. The $23.5 million facility was funded through a combination of redevelopment bonds, developer impact fees and grants.

As of 2011, the city had completed about half of a -long riverfront trail system that will eventually connect with trails in Lakeside and Mission Trails Regional Park.

Government
As of 2022, the Santee City Council was composed of Mayor John Minto, Vice Mayor Ronn Hall, and council members Laura Koval, Rob McNelis, and Dustin Trotter.

State and federal representation 

Education
San Diego Christian College moved to Santee from El Cajon in early 2013. The college, which offers 15 degree programs, is accredited by the Western Association of Schools and Colleges. The college has approximately 475 students and 28 faculty members, but hopes to expand to as many as 1,200 students.

Santee is served by two school districts: Santee School District and Grossmont Union High School District. The two high schools in Santee, West Hills High School and Santana High School, are both part of the Grossmont Union High School District. Elementary and middle schools are part of the Santee School District. Other than Sycamore Canyon (only K-6), each school campus serves kindergarten through eighth grade (K-8). The schools are divided into elementary (K-6) and junior high (7–8), with each using different parts of the campus and having different ending times. This is different from the traditional practice of smaller elementary schools that feed students into consolidated middle schools.

Elementary and middle school campuses 

 Cajon Park School
 Carlton Hills School
 Carlton Oaks School
 Chet F. Harrit School
 Hill Creek School
 Pepper Drive School
 Pride Academy at Prospect Avenue School
 Rio Seco School
 Sycamore Canyon School

High schools 
There are two high schools in Santee. Both are part of the Grossmont Union High School District.
 Santana High School
 West Hills High School

On March 5, 2001, 15-year-old Charles Andrew Williams opened fire in a boys' bathroom and a grass quad area at Santana High School. Two students died and thirteen students were wounded. He pleaded guilty to the shooting and was sentenced to 50 years to life in prison.

Infrastructure

Transportation
State Route 52 was extended eastward through the city from its former terminus at State Route 125 to State Route 67 on the city's east side. The city is bisected by four main thoroughfares: Mast Boulevard and Mission Gorge Road traverse east and west, while Magnolia Avenue and Cuyamaca Street cross north and south. Santee also is the eastern terminus of the San Diego Metropolitan Transit System (MTS) Green Line trolley route, which connects East County to Old Town and downtown San Diego. MTS also provides bus service. Gillespie Field, the oldest and largest of eight commercial aviation airports operated by San Diego County, is located on Santee's southern border with the city of El Cajon. The airport serves as a hub for local businesses.

Notable people
 Sharon Ryer Davis, wife of former California Gov. Gray Davis, was raised in the city and crowned Miss Santee in 1968.
Brian Jones (born 1968), politician serving in the California State Senate
 Mega64, Internet sketch comedy group.
 Dat Phan, stand-up comedian
 Stephen Strasburg, MLB pitcher, currently of the Washington Nationals, MVP of the 2019 World Series
 Marty Tripes, former professional motocross racer and member of the AMA Motorcycle Hall of Fame
 Jeremy "Twitch" Stenberg, professional Freestyle Motocross rider
 Randy Voepel, politician

See also

References

External links

 City of Santee official website
 Santee, CA City-Data Profile
 Santee Historical Society Official Website

 
Cities in San Diego County, California
East County (San Diego County)
San Diego metropolitan area
Incorporated cities and towns in California
Populated places established in 1980
1980 establishments in California